Mario Occhiuto (born 6 January 1964), is an Italian politician and architect.

Occhiuto was born in Cosenza and trained as an architect at the University of Florence, graduating in 1987. He was elected Mayor of Cosenza in 2011 and President of the Province of Cosenza in 2014.

He was re-elected Mayor of Cosenza for a second term on 7 June 2016.

References

External links
Biography (in Italian) on designrepublic.it

1964 births
Living people
People from Cosenza
Politicians of Calabria
Mayors of Cosenza
Presidents of the Province of Cosenza
20th-century Italian architects
21st-century Italian architects